Álvaro Leyva Durán (born 26 August 1942) is a Colombian lawyer, economist, politician, human rights defender and diplomat. Since 7 August 2022, he has held the position of Minister of Foreign Affairs of his country, in the government of Gustavo Petro.

Leyva has held various portfolios in different governments, being Minister of Government and of Mines and Energy; he has also been a congressman, councilman, and constituent in 1991. Since the 1980s, he has sought negotiated solutions to the armed conflict with the guerrillas

Early life

Exiled in the United States 
He attended primary school in Colombia, but had to complete his studies in New York, when, on 13 June 1953, General Gustavo Rojas Pinilla overthrew President Laureano Gómez (for whom his father Jorge has worked as minister since 1950)

Peace mediator

Betancur government
President Betancur subsequently appointed him Minister of Mines and Energy in 1984 until 17 June 1985, being replaced by the controversial businessman Iván Duque Escobar (father of former President Iván Duque Márquez)

This closeness to the guerrilla groups and the establishment of friendships with the guerrilla leaders began to generate many accusations and criticisms, and he later earned the nickname "The True Foreign Minister of the FARC", comparing him to the guerrilla Rodrigo Granda, who I had that nickname.
Despite his closeness to the guerrillas, his peace efforts were in vain due to little state commitment, even being the victim of an attack in February 1986.

Samper government
Despite the failure of the peace process in 1992, the Liberals won the elections again, this time with Ernesto Samper. Leyva collaborated with the FARC in dialogues with the demilitarization of the municipality of La Uribe, but, as a result of the outbreak of the illegal financing scandal of the Samper campaign known as Process 8,000, the negotiations went to the background and finally the attempts to peace. He also helped implement the Protocols to the Geneva Conventions, which were signed in Colombia in 1995.

Leyva achieved the release in 1997 of 60 soldiers who were kidnapped at the Las Delicias base in 1996, and again attempted a peace agreement with the FARC, which was reached in 1998 with President Andrés Pastrana. However, he was involved in another scandal in 1997, since he and the liberal leader Juan Manuel Santos were holding talks with paramilitaries and guerrillas for the resignation of President Samper, but it did not go down well with the press that Santos and Leyva were traveling in a helicopter from the emerald Víctor Carranza to visit Carlos Castaño.

Pastrana government
Leyva participated in the first rapprochement between the government of Andrés Pastrana and the FARC-EP in the Caguan talks, and in fact, it was thanks to the photograph of Pastrana with Tirofijo that came out days before the second round presidential elections (product of a meeting sponsored by Leyva), that Pastrana won the presidency over the favorite Horacio Serpa.

However, prosecutor Alfonso Gómez Méndez accused him of illicit enrichment for money allegedly received from the Cali Cartel, and Leyva fled to Costa Rica, proving there that it was political persecution, for which he received political asylum there. country and the Office of the United Nations High Commissioner for Refugees granted him refugee status. ​ He was captured in Madrid by Interpol on October 23, 2002 and was imprisoned for 2 months. Finally, after being acquitted by the Colombian Supreme Court of Justice, he returned to Colombia in 2006.

Uribe government
After the elections, Leyva continued to carry out peace efforts to reach a humanitarian agreement with the guerrillas during the second administration of President Uribe, with the knowledge and approval of the government.

In those days, however, the controversy awoke again, when emails from the dejected guerrilla leader Raúl Reyes were discovered in which Leyva is mentioned, and which would date from his time as presidential candidate in 2006, and in which there was talk of a exchange of former candidate Ingrid Betancourt if Leyva won the elections, and he, on the other hand, would adapt his government program to the postulates of the Eighth Conference of the FARC.

Presidential candidacies 
He was the promoter of the referendum in the Conservative Party, an initiative that other directors of that group (such as former President Pastrana) did not allow to prosper to stop his possible presidential aspiration in 1986, turning support towards Álvaro Gómez Hurtado. In the end, the liberal Virgilio Barco won the vote.

In the Barco government, Leyva created the Commission for the Promotion of the Reconciliation Policy, with the help of former presidents Alfonso López Michelsen and Pastrana, whose objective was to allow rapprochement between the government and the FARC. At that time, he was accused of financially benefiting from the kidnappings carried out by the FARC and his closeness to the insurgency ended up stigmatizing him forever.

Presidential candidatury (1990) 
In 1989 he presented his presidential candidacy, endorsed by the controversial book War sells more, but his party turned its efforts to support the candidacy of businessman Rodrigo Lloreda, before the departure of Álvaro Gómez due to a difference with former president Pastrana. César Gaviria, close to the assassinated candidate Luis Carlos Galán (the favorite in the polls) ended up defeating Gómez in the elections, and Lloreda only came in fourth place.

Presidential candidatury (2006) 
In 2006, Leyva was a candidate for the presidency for the National Reconciliation Movement, the result of his dissidence from the Conservative Party, as a result of the conservatism decided to support the re-election of President Álvaro Uribe During his presidential candidacy he said that he would be able to stop the war in six months and allocate the resources of the conflict to social programs, with a government program known as "Noah's Ark". However, in the absence of guarantees to continue with the campaign, Leyva withdrew his candidacy 20 days before the elections.  Ultimately, Uribe was re-elected president.

Notes

References

External links 

|-

|-

1942 births
Living people
Politicians from Bogotá
Pontifical Xavierian University alumni
Foreign ministers of Colombia
Cabinet of Gustavo Petro
Ministers of Mines and Energy of Colombia
Colombian Conservative Party politicians
20th-century Colombian politicians
21st-century Colombian politicians